Acanthostichus bentoni is a species of ant belonging to the genus Acanthostichus. It was described by Mackay in 1996. These ants are distributed in Brazil.

References

Dorylinae
Endemic fauna of Brazil
Hymenoptera of South America
Insects described in 1996